The 2020 Eliteserien was the 76th season of top-tier football in Norway. This was fourth season of Eliteserien as rebranding from Tippeligaen. 

The season was scheduled to begin on 4 April, but due to the COVID-19 pandemic in Norway the opening games of the season were delayed, first until 2 May, then further delayed until 23 May. The season was scheduled to end 29 November 2020, not including play-off matches, but was rescheduled to conclude on 22 December. On 7 May, the Norwegian government allowed the league to start on 16 June with full training starting immediately.

Molde were the defending champions. Aalesund, Sandefjord and Start joined as the promoted clubs from the 2019 1. divisjon. They replaced Lillestrøm, Tromsø and Ranheim who were relegated to the 2020 1. divisjon.

Effects of the COVID-19 pandemic
The season was scheduled to begin on 4 April, but on 12 March it was revealed that the first five rounds of the season were postponed and the opening game therefore would be delayed until 2 May due to the COVID-19 pandemic in Norway. On 24 March, the Norwegian Football Federation announced that the football season was further delayed till 23 May. On 7 May, the Norwegian government allowed the teams to begin with full training starting immediately, and opened for the league season to start on 16 June. On 12 June, the NFF announced that 200 spectators would be allowed to attend the games.
On 30 September, the Minister of Culture and Church Affairs, Abid Raja, announced that clubs would be able to have crowds of 600 at games from 12 October.

Teams
Sixteen teams compete in the league – the top thirteen teams from the previous season, and three teams promoted from 1. division. The promoted teams were Aalesund (after an absence of two years), Sandefjord and Start (both returning to the top flight after one season's absence). They replaced Lillestrøm, Tromsø and Ranheim, ending their top flight spells of forty-five, five and two years respectively.

Stadiums and locations

Note: Table lists in alphabetical order.

Personnel and kits

Managerial changes

Transfers

Winter

Summer

League table

Positions by round

Results

Relegation playoffs 

The 14th-placed team in Eliteserien will play against the winners of the 1. divisjon promotion play-offs on neutral ground to decide who will play in the 2021 Eliteserien.

Mjøndalen IF won 3–2 and maintained their position in the Eliteserien; Sogndal Fotball stayed in the 1. divisjon.

Season statistics

Top scorers

Hat-tricks

Top assists

Clean sheets

Discipline

Player

Most yellow cards: 9
 Niklas Gunnarsson (Strømsgodset)

Most red cards: 2
 Alexander Betten Hansen (Mjøndalen)
 Ipalibo Jack (Strømsgodset)

Club

Most yellow cards: 69  
Aalesund

Most red cards: 3
Mjøndalen
Molde
Sandefjord
Vålerenga

Awards

Annual awards

League attendances
Due to COVID-19 restrictions only 200 people were allowed in each match at the beginning of the season.

Two clubs were punished for incidents of racism during their matches, having to play certain games without attendants.

See also
 2020 Norwegian Football Cup

References

Eliteserien seasons
0
Norway
Norway
Eliteserien